Joachim I, (? – 1504) was Ecumenical Patriarch of Constantinople from 1498 to 1502 and for a short time in 1504.

Life
Concerning the early life of Joachim before he became Patriarch of Constantinople, we know that he was Metropolitan of Drama and that he was young, not particularly learned but very able in ecclesiastic matters and striking for virtue. In autumn 1498 he was elected as Patriarch with the support of king Constantine II of Georgia, taking the place of Nephon II who in turn was supported by the rulers of Wallachia. Georgia was Christian country independent from the Ottoman Empire and semi-autonomous from a religious point of view, but which could sometimes apply impressive influence on the patriarchal elections.

As Patriarch, Joachim was quite popular with his flock: while he was on the road to Georgia to raise funds, the Metropolitan of
Selymbria offered the Sultan one thousand gold pieces to be appointed Patriarch in Joachim's place, but the faithful collected the same amount among themselves and paid it to the Sultan to avoid Joachim's deposition. In spring 1502, Joachim was however deposed by Sultan Bayezid II when the latter discovered that Joachim had ordered the building of a Christian church of stone without his permission.

After Joachim's deposition, the new Patriarch-elect was again Nephon II, who however refused the office. Then the rulers of Wallachia moved their support to Pachomius I, who was elected in early 1503 and reigned for about one year, until early 1504 when the friends of Joachim collected 3500 gold pieces to restore him on the throne (500 pieces more than the usual fee paid to the Sultan for each patriarchal appointment).

Joachim's second patriarchate lasted only a few months: shortly after being elected, Joachim traveled north trying to restore friendly relations with his political enemies, but both Radu IV the Great of Wallachia and Bogdan III the One-Eyed of Moldavia refused to reconcile with him. Joachim died in 1504 during his sojourn in Wallachia, in Târgoviște or in Drista, and he was succeeded again by Pachomius I.

Notes

External links
 Historia politica et patriarchica Constantinopoleos, Cap XIV: P. Ioachimus, (trans. Martin Crusius, 1584) Primary source. 

15th-century Greek people
15th-century patriarchs of Constantinople
1504 deaths
Year of birth unknown
16th-century Greek people
16th-century Ecumenical Patriarchs of Constantinople